The Chief of the General Staff is the Chief of the General Staff of the Slovak Armed Forces. He is appointed by the President of Slovakia, who is the commander-in-chief. The current Chief of the General Staff is Lieutenant General Daniel Zmeko.

List of chiefs of the general staff
For period from 1919 to 1992, see Chief of the General Staff of Czechoslovakia.

Notes

See also
 Slovak Armed Forces

Military of Slovakia
Slovak General Staff Chiefs
Slovakia